Christian IX's Gade (lit. "Christian IV's Street") is a street in central Copenhagen, Denmark.  It runs from Gammel Mønt in the south to Gothersgade in the north.

History

Christian IX's Gade was created in 1906 when a private consortium, Christian IXs Gades Byggekonsortium redeveloped the entire block between Møntergade and Store Regnegade. Copenhagen's new neighbourhoods outside the old fortifications were experiencing rapid population growth while the population in the old city was declining. Some of the oldest and most ramshack housing blocks were therefore being replaced by commercial buildings or modern apartment buildings. The new street ran diagonally through the area. It was named after Christian IX who had just died. Construction progressed fast and had been completed in 1910.

Buildings
Eugen Jørgensen, who was both a partner in the development company and a member of the City Council, designed all the buildings along the street. They are built in a monumental National Romantic style, combining red brick and roof tiles with architectural details such as bay windows, orio windows, exposed timber framing, turrets and spires. The north side of the street forms one side of a triangular block which is completed by Møntergade and Gammel Mønt. The south side of the street is divided in two by Ny Østergade.

No. 6 received an award from the city but the architecture was generally subject to widespread criticism for being bombastic and overloaded.

Image gallery

See also
 Store Strandstræde 19-21

References

External links

Christian IV's Gade at indenforvoldene.dk

Streets in Copenhagen
National Romantic architecture in Copenhagen
1906 establishments in Denmark